Cooloola may refer to:

Animals
 Cooloola (insect), a genus of the insect family Cooloolidae
 Cooloola monster (Cooloola propator), a species of the genus
 Cooloola sedge frog (Litoria cooloolensis)

Places
 Cooloola Great Walk, 102 km coastal bushwalking route
 Cooloola, Queensland, a locality in the Gympie Region, Queensland, Australia
 Shire of Cooloola, Queensland, Australia (now part of Gympie Region)

Other
 Cooloola Christian College, Gympie, Queensland
 Tillandsia 'Cooloola', a plant cultivar